Nefedovskaya is a rural locality (a village) in Tarnogskoye Rural Settlement, Tarnogsky District, Vologda Oblast, Russia. The population was 31 as of 2002.

Geography 
Nefedovskaya is located 16 km northeast of Tarnogsky Gorodok (the district's administrative centre) by road. Manyukovskaya is the nearest rural locality.

References 

Rural localities in Tarnogsky District